The Israeli Figure Skating Championships is a figure skating competition held annually to crown the national champions of Israel. Winners are given the title of National Champion. Over the years, the date of the competition has been moved for regional political reasons or for the lack of ice. Nationals are mostly held in the Canada Centre in Metulla. The levels of the nationals are senior, junior, novice, and age groups. The disciplines of competition are men's singles, ladies' singles, pair skating, and ice dancing. Some years some disciplines are not held because there are no skaters in those disciplines. The competition is held by the Israel Ice Skating Federation, which was founded in 1990. It joined the International Skating Union as a full member in 1993.
.

Senior medalists

Men

Ladies

Pairs

Ice dancing

Junior medalists

Men

Ladies

Ice dancing

Novice medalists

Men

Ladies

Ice dancing

References

External links

 Israeli skating federation
 2008–09 results

 
Figure skating national championships
Figure skating in Israel